Nikita Vladimirovich Bocharov (born 12 June 1992) is a Russian professional football player who plays in Kazakhstan for Turan.

Career
Bocharov made his Russian Premier League debut for FC Rubin Kazan on 6 May 2012 in a game against FC Anzhi Makhachkala.

In February 2016, Bocharov signed a two-year contract with Kazakhstan Premier League side FC Aktobe.

On 21 January 2019, FC Tobol announced the signing of Bocharov on a two-year contract. On 21 February 2020, Bocharov was released by Tobol.

References

External links
 

1992 births
Living people
Russian footballers
Russia youth international footballers
Russia under-21 international footballers
Russian Premier League players
Kazakhstan Premier League players
FC Rubin Kazan players
FC Aktobe players
Footballers from Saint Petersburg
Russian expatriate footballers
Expatriate footballers in Kazakhstan
Association football midfielders
FC Zenit Saint Petersburg players
FC Tom Tomsk players
FC Neftekhimik Nizhnekamsk players
FC Turan players